Pseudopseudohypoparathyroidism (PPHP) is an inherited disorder, named for its similarity to pseudohypoparathyroidism in presentation. It is more properly Albright hereditary osteodystrophy although without resistance of parathyroid hormone as frequently seen in that affliction. The term Pseudopseudohypoparathyroidism is used to describe a condition where the individual has the phenotypic appearance of Pseudohypoparathyroidism type 1a, but has (unexpected for the phenotype) normal labs including calcium and PTH.

It can be considered a variant of Albright hereditary osteodystrophy, or Pseudohypoparathyroidism type 1A, as they present with the same constellation of signs and symptoms, including short stature, brachydactyly, subcutaneous calcification, and obesity.

Presentation
Pseudopseudohypoparathyroidism can be best understood by comparing it to other conditions:

Hormone resistance is not present in Pseudopseudohypoparathyroidism. Short stature may be present. Obesity is less common in Pseudopseudohypoparathyroidism  than in Pseudohypoparathyroidism. Osteoma cutis may be present.

Genetics

A male with Pseudohypoparathyroidism has a 50% chance of passing on the defective GNAS gene to his children, although in an imprinted, inactive form. Any of his children receiving this gene will have Pseudopseudohypoparathyroidism. Any of his daughters that have Pseudopseudohypoparathyroidism may in turn pass along Pseudohypoparathyroidism 1A to her children as the imprinting pattern on the inherited paternal gene will be changed to the maternal pattern in the mother's ovum during meiosis. The gene will be reactivated in any children who inherit it.

Pseudopseudohypoparathyroidism and pseudohypoparathyroidism both involve the same GNAS gene, but Pseudopseudohypoparathyroidism has normal calcium homeostasis because of the normal maternal allele in the kidney.

Pathophysiology
The GNAS1 gene involved in both Pseudohypoparathyroidism type 1a and Pseudopseudohypoparathyroidism is greatly affected by imprinting. When a father who has Pseudohypoparathyroidism undergoes spermatogenesis, imprinting of the GNAS1 gene inactivates both copies of his genes: one will be Functional and the other will be defective. Tissues in the body will re-activate different copies of the GNAS1 gene selectively; the kidneys will selectively activate the (functional) maternal copy while keeping the (defective) paternally-derived gene imprinted and inactive, even in normal individuals. Since the maternally-derived GNAS1 gene is functional, renal handling of calcium and phosphate is normal, and homeostasis is maintained in Pseudopseudohypoparathyroidism. However, the rest of the tissues will instead selectively display the defective gene, resulting in haploinsufficiency of the GNAS1 product in most tissues, and giving the phenotype of Pseudohypoparathyroidism type 1a. As a result, there is also a normal response of urinary cAMP to PTH, and normal serum PTH.

Diagnosis
The diagnosis is based on the presence of the Albright hereditary osteodystrophy pseudotype but without the PTH resistance. Blood tests including calcium, phosphate, and PTH will exclude other forms of Pseudohypoparathyroidism. X-rays may reveal a short fourth metacarpal. Genetic testing can confirm the diagnosis by showing GNAS gene mutation.

Treatment
Treatments focuses on symptoms, with genetic counseling recommended.

History
It was characterized in 1952 by Fuller Albright as "pseudo-pseudohypoparathyroidism" (with hyphen).

See also
 Antidisestablishmentarianism
 Floccinaucinihilipilification
 GNAS complex locus
 Honorificabilitudinitatibus
 Longest word in English
 Longest words
 Parathyroid hormone
 Pneumonoultramicroscopicsilicovolcanoconiosis
 Supercalifragilisticexpialidocious

References

External links 

Cell surface receptor deficiencies
Long words
Rare diseases
English words